Monika Mundu is an Indian playback singer and actress. She has sung songs in 12 languages including Nagpuri, Bengali, Hindi, Mundari, Santali, Khortha and Kurukh. Her first film was Jharkhand kar Chhaila, She also acted in film M.S. Dhoni: The Untold Story.

Filmography

Films

Awards and honors 
Aparajita Award (2008)
Sanskritik Samman (2015) by Kala Sanskriti Vibhag.

References

Bengali playback singers
Living people
1971 births